"When I Dream" is a song written by Sandy Mason Theoret, and recorded by American country music artist Crystal Gayle.  It was released in April 1979 as the third and final single and title track from the June 1978 album When I Dream.   The song was originally released on her 1975 eponymous debut album and was re-recorded for her 1978 album.

Chart performance
The song reached number 3 on the Billboard Hot Country Singles & Tracks chart.

Weekly charts

Year-end charts

Other versions
 The song was later recorded by Willie Nelson on his 1986 album Partners.

References

1979 singles
Crystal Gayle songs
Willie Nelson songs
Song recordings produced by Allen Reynolds
United Artists Records singles
1975 songs
Songs about dreams